La Calavera Catrina ("The Dapper [female] Skull") had its origin as a zinc etching created by the Mexican printmaker and lithographer José Guadalupe Posada (1852-1913) around 1910. It was first published posthumously in 1913 in a satiric broadside (a newspaper-sized sheet of paper) as a photo-relief etching.   This image of a female skull with a large hat appeared in at least four broadsides, accompanied by different satiric texts (none written by Posada). 

In 1946-47, the Mexican muralist Diego Rivera (1886-1957) elaborated Posada's creation into a full-scale figure that he placed in his fresco "A Dream of a Sunday Afternoon in the Alameda Park" (now in the Museo Mural Diego Rivera). Whereas Posada's print likely intended to satirize upper class women of the Porfiriato, Rivera, through various iconographic attributes that referenced indigenous cultures, rehabilitated her into a Mexican national symbol.

La Catrina is a ubiquitous character associated with Day of the Dead, both in Mexico and around the world. Additionally, it has become an icon of Mexican identity, sometimes used in opposition to the Halloween Jack-o'-lantern.

First appearances 
The Vanegas Arroyo family, which published many of Posada's most important works, printed at least four broadsides with Posada's Catrina, all of which have different texts and accompanying images. The first of these broadsides, published for Day of the Dead in 1913, is titled "Remate de Calaveras Alegres y Sandungueras, Las que hoy son empolvadas Garbanceras pararán en deformes calaveras" ("The Ending of the Cheerful and Sandunga-dancing Calaveras", "those that today are powdered chick pea-vendors will end as deformed Calaveras"). Though Posada had probably made his print as a criticism of the wealthy elite, the text of the 1913 broadside was a vicious attack on working class women who sold garbanzo beans (instead of foods native to Mexico).

The second publication of Posada's image was in a broadside titled "Han Salido por Fin, Las Calaveras" ("They have finally left"), issued sometime after Antonio Vanegas Arroyo's death in 1917. The third broadside with the image was called "Calaveras de la Cucaracha, Una Fiesta en Ultratumba" ("Calaveras of the cockroach, a fiesta from beyond the grave"). The text includes the word "catrines" (male dandies). Curator Ruben C. Cordova thinks it was printed in the 1920s. "El Panteon de las Pelonas" ("Graveyard of bald/dead women"), the fourth Catrina broadside,  is dated 1924. 

Diego Rivera's mural Sueño de una Tarde Dominical en la Alameda Central ("Dream of a Sunday afternoon in the Central Alameda"), which stretches 15 yards, depicts 400 years of Mexican history from the Spanish Conquest to the Revolution. Rivera included many historical figures in the fresco, which was originally painted for the Hotel del Prado in the historic center of Mexico City. When the 1985 earthquake required the destruction of the hotel, the fresco was moved to the Museo Mural Diego Rivera, which is adjacent to the Alameda Park. The museum was built specifically to house and display Rivera's restored mural.

Rivera placed Posada (dressed in a black suit) and Catrina in the center of his fresco. Rivera depicted himself as a boy who hold's Catrina's hand. Frida Kahlo stands behind and between them. Rivera keeps the big bourgeoise hat that Posada gave to Catrina. But instead of outfitting her with a matching bourgeois gown, he puts her in a simple Tehuana skirt, similar to those Kahlo wore, which were associated with indigenous women from Tehuantepec. The feather rattlesnake boa links Catrina with the Mesoamerican god Quetzalcoatl (the feathered serpent), and its stone rattle connects her to the Aztec goddess Coatlicue ("She of the Serpent Skirt"). Like snakes and Coatlicue, Rivera's Catrina has fangs and a bloody mouth. The gold belt buckle has an ollin glyph, which symbolizes movement (and the earthquakes the Aztecs thought would end their era). Eyes are visible behind the skull mask, which makes this a life and death figure. Cordova argues that Rivera made Catrina into a nationalist emblem that referenced indigenous cultures and the philosophy of dualism.

Cultural importance 
Catrina became central to Mexican identity in part because Posada was made into the "primary artistic ancestor figure" for the generation of the Mexican Muralists. Additionally, for many years, influential Day of the Dead festivities in Mexico City were held at museums that centered on Rivera and Kahlo, where the Linares family made three dimensional versions of Posada's prints out of papier mâché. Consequently, Posada, Rivera, and Kahlo were woven into foundational urban commemorations in Mexico City. Even without the Mesoamerican attributes Rivera provided to Catrina, she still functions as a national emblem associated specifically with Mexico.

Catrina appears on all manner of commercial and festive products relating to Day of the Dead. Her image inspires numerous artists to recreate her every year. There are numerous contests for the biggest, the most, and the best Catrinas, especially in Mexico and the U.S. Catrina impersonators abound, and there are even Catrina fashion shows, and Catrina-themed balls and benefits for non-profit organizations.

Artistic subtext

Culture 
The culture of La Calavera has ties to political satire and is also a well-kept tradition as the original was inspired by the polarizing reign of dictator Porfirio Díaz. Díaz is lauded for modernizing and bringing financial stability to Mexico, but he also led his government in repression, corruption, and excess, and had an apparent obsession with European materialism and culture. Christine Delsol writes: "Concentration of fantastic wealth in the hands of the privileged few brewed discontent in the hearts of the suffering many, leading to the 1910 rebellion that toppled Diaz in 1911 and became the Mexican Revolution."

Folk art

Purist 
La Calavera Catrina today can be found in her more traditional form both in drawn works as well as sculptures made out of Oaxacan wood carvings, paper-mâché sculptures, majolica pottery, and barro negro black clay pottery. She is also coupled with male skeletons.

Costume 
Dressing as a "Catrina" is a popular costume in Day of the Dead celebrations in Mexico. Catrinas typically feature calavera (sugar skull) make-up. There is also a male counterpart to the Catrina, called the Catrin. They wear the same skull makeup and black clothes, either a formal suit with a top hat or a mariachi costume. A cane might also be part of the costume.

Gallery

See also 
 All Saints Day
 Danse Macabre
 Day of the Dead
 Death (personification)
 Ghosts in Mexican culture
 Memento mori
 Santa Muerte
 Skeleton (undead)

References

External links 

 Calavera Catrina by José Guadalupe Posada in the Digital Collections of the Ibero-American Institute

Mexican culture
1913 works
20th-century etchings
Fictional skeletons
Holiday characters
Mexican art
Personifications of death
Skulls in art